Dovecote Records was a New York-based independent record label. It was run by its founder, Carter Matschullat, and was distributed by Redeye Distribution in the US.

Artists and projects
Dovecote's roster included Wise Blood, SSION,  Hooray for Earth, Supreme Cuts, Ski Lodge,  Jonquil, Wunder Wunder, The Futureheads, Ed Harcourt, Mason Proper, Tim Williams, Trevor Giuliani, Cast Spells, Bad Veins, Blamma! Blamma! and Aberdeen City. In 2011 Dovecote Records held a SXSW showcase featuring performances by Wise Blood, Hooray for Earth, Dominique Young Unique, Baths, Trash Talk, and Big Freedia. In 2012 Dovecote released a photo book with hardcore band Trash Talk that included a 7" single. Dovecote's final release was Racy by Hooray for Earth in 2014.

Releases
The following albums, EP's, and singles were released on Dovecote Records:

See also 
 List of record labels

References

External links
 

American independent record labels
Indie rock record labels
Electronic music record labels
 
 
 
Defunct record labels of the United States